A grand coalition is an arrangement in a multi-party parliamentary system in which the two largest political parties of opposing political ideologies unite in a coalition government. The term is most commonly used in countries where there are two dominant parties with different ideological orientations, and a number of smaller parties that have passed the electoral threshold to secure representation in the parliament. The two large parties will each try to secure enough seats in any election to have a majority government alone, and if this fails each will attempt to form a coalition with smaller parties that have a similar ideological orientation. Because the two large parties will tend to differ on major ideological issues, and portray themselves as rivals, or even sometimes enemies, they will usually find it more difficult to agree on a common direction for a combined government with each other than with smaller parties.

Causes of a grand coalition
Occasionally circumstances arise where normally opposing parties may find it desirable to form a government. One is a national crisis such as a war or depression, where people feel a need for national unity and stability that overcomes ordinary ideological differences. This is especially true where there is broad agreement about the best policy to deal with the crisis. In this case, a grand coalition may occur even when one party has enough seats to govern alone. An example would be the British national governments during World War I and before and during World War II.

Another possibility is that the major parties may find they have more in common ideologically with each other than with the smaller parties, or that the fragmentation of the smaller parties is so great that no other coalition is stable. Examples include Austria, where the mainstream parties of the left and right have often formed grand coalitions to keep parties of the far left or far right out of government (an example of a cordon sanitaire), or Israel, where no single party has ever won enough seats to govern alone, and, in some parliaments, the fragmentation and intransigence of some of the smaller parties has made it easier to maintain a coherent platform with a grand coalition than with a narrow one. This is often done out of political necessity, to prevent an early election.

Grand coalitions by country

Austria
In post-war Austria, a "grand coalition" between the Social Democratic Party of Austria (SPÖ) and the conservative Austrian People's Party (ÖVP) has been standard since World War II. Of the 31 governments which have taken office since 1945, 20 have been grand coalitions, including eleven consecutively from 1945 to 1966. Grand coalitions again governed from 1987 to 2000 and 2007 to 2017. Grand coalitions have also been common on the state level – as of July 2020, grand coalitions govern Carinthia, Styria, Lower Austria, and Upper Austria; in the case of the latter two, grand coalitions (more specifically, all-party government) are compulsory by the constitution.

Czech Republic
After the Velvet Revolution, there was a government of socialists (ČSSD) with Prime Minister Miloš Zeman supported by the right-wing ODS, known as the opposition agreement.

European Union
In the European Parliament, the two main pan-European party groups are the European People's Party (EPP) and the Socialists & Democrats (S&D). Until 2019, they held a majority in the European Parliament and worked together in a grand coalition. However, advances by green, liberal and right-wing populist parties across Europe in the 2019 European Parliament election led to the EPP-S&D coalition losing their majority, making Renew Europe support necessary to give Ursula von der Leyen and her commission a majority in the European Parliament.

Estonia 
Kaja Kallas' first cabinet was a grand coalition between the Reform Party and the Centre Party.

Kallas dismissed the Centre ministers from her cabinet in June 2022, leaving it in a minority. She then formed another such coalition with the Social Democrats, in addition to Isamaa, after an agreement among Reform and the two other parties.

Germany

In post-war Germany, "grand coalition" refers to a governing coalition of the two largest parties, usually the Christian Democrats (CDU/CSU) with the Social Democrats (SPD). While Germany has historically tended to favour narrow coalitions of one of the two largest parties with the FDP or with the Greens, four grand coalitions have been formed on a federal level: the Kiesinger cabinet (1966–1969), the First Merkel cabinet (2005–2009), the Third Merkel cabinet (2013-2018), and the Fourth Merkel cabinet (2018–2021). Under the Weimar Republic, the Great Coalition included all of the major parties of the left, centre, and centre-right who formed the basis of most governments - the SPD, the Catholic Centre Party, the German Democratic Party (DDP), and the German People's Party (DVP). The two examples were the first and second Stresemann cabinets (August–November 1923) and, less ephemerally, the second Müller cabinet (1928-1930).

Iceland

Iceland has a grand coalition since 30 November 2017 between the largest parties of the centre-right Independence Party (16), the left-wing Left-Green Movement (9), and the liberal agrarian Progressive Party (8). All of the parties are opposed to EU integration.

India

In the Indian state of Maharashtra, the Maha Vikas Aghadi alliance was formed between the Indian National Congress, the Nationalist Congress Party (NCP) and the Shiv Sena after the 2019 Maharashtra Legislative Assembly election. While the Congress and the NCP reflect centre to centre-left policies and have a secular ideology, the Shiv Sena reflects right-wing policies and has a Hindu-nationalist ideology. The alliance formed the government in Maharashtra after a political crisis. The government lasted for 2.5 years, after which in 2022 a rebellion occurred in Shiv Sena regarding the alliance and another political crisis followed. After the government collapsed, the Shiv Sena split into two factions; the relatively moderate and secular group Shiv Sena (Uddhav Balasaheb Thackeray) (SS (UBT)) led by Uddhav Thackeray and the Balasahebanchi Shiv Sena, the Hindu nationalist group led by Eknath Shinde. The alliance still exists between the Congress, the NCP and the SS (UBT), though they sit in the opposition in the Maharashtra Legislative Assembly.

Israel

Israel has had several grand coalition governments. The first was the wartime government of Levi Eshkol, formed in 1967 and which lasted until 1970. Subsequent grand coalitions were formed in the 1980s and at several points in the 21st century.

Several of Israel's grand coalitions were rotation governments, in which the premiership alternated between center-left and center-right leaders. The first was from 1984 to 1988, led by Shimon Peres and Yitzhak Shamir (which was continued as a non-rotation grand coalition until 1990). The current rotation grand coalition government is the current Bennett-Lapid government, which succeeded another rotation grand coalition in the form of the Netanyahu-Gantz government.

Italy

In Italy, "grand coalition" refers to the only supermajority government formed in April 2013 between center-left Democratic Party (PD), center-right The People of Freedom (PdL) party, and the centrist Civic Choice (SC) and Union of the Centre (UdC) parties. In November 2013, The People of Freedom (later renamed as Forza Italia) however dropped out and broke apart, leaving the Letta Cabinet and further Renzi Cabinet (Coalition between PD, NCD, SC and UdC) with a small majority.

Japan

Following the 1993 Japanese general elections, the historically hegemonic Liberal Democratic Party was narrowly placed into the opposition in the lower house for the first time in its history. The former opposition, consisting of parties ranging from the Japan Socialist Party to the neoconservative Japan Renewal Party, united around Morihiro Hosokawa as their choice for prime minister. After having passed electoral reform legislation, which was the coalition's raison d'être, the bickering between ideological factions soon led to the grand coalition falling apart less than a year later. Then soon after the JSP negotiated with the LDP to form a grand coalition government in 1994. The grand coalition government was last until January 1996 and the JSP collapsed after losing much of political support.

Liechtenstein
The Patriotic Union and the Progressive Citizens' Party have often governed Liechtenstein together, including the entire period from 1938 to 1997.

Malaysia

The Pakatan Harapan coalition and the Barisan National coalition formed the first grand coalition government in Malaysia in 2022, after the country's 15th general election. No major coalition secured enough seats in these elections to secure a simple majority in parliament. Thus, the country had a hung parliament for the first time in its history. A few days after the election, the Conference of Rulers decreed that party leaders must work together to form a government. Pakatan Harapan's Prime Minister candidate, Anwar Ibrahim, was sworn in as the country's 10th Prime Minister after securing the support of Barisan National, its longstanding opponent, together with other parties that make the Borneo Bloc — Gabungan Parti Sarawak (GPS), Gabungan Rakyat Sabah (GRS) and Warisan. This coalition government is commonly referred to as a Unity Government, even in official communication by the government itself, but this is not a commonly-accepted use of the term. A Unity Government is typically defined as a broad coalition government that lacks opposition.  In Malaysia's case, the Perikatan Nasional coalition serves as the biggest group in the opposition bloc.

Romania

After the political crisis in autumn 2021, PNL, PSD and the UDMR reached an agreement to rule the country together for the next 7 years. Thus, it has been agreed that the prime minister and several other important ministries should be changed every 1 year and a half. The prime minister to be appointed was national-liberal Nicolae Ciucă. His cabinet was sworn in on 25 November. The coalition supports the Romanian President Klaus Iohannis.

Netherlands
In the Netherlands, there have been several cabinets which can be described as grand coalitions. The Roman/Red coalitions of the 1940s and 1950s under Prime Minister Willem Drees were composed of  the catholic Catholic People's Party (KVP) and the social-democratic Labour Party (PvdA) at its core and several smaller parties as backup (Drees–Van Schaik). The Purple coalitions in the 1990s under Prime Minister Wim Kok were between the Labour Party (PvdA), the conservative liberal People's Party for Freedom and Democracy (VVD) and the social-liberal Democrats 66 (D66) party (First Kok cabinet). The Second Rutte cabinet a grand coalition cabinet which also can be described as a purple coalition was composed of the People's Party for Freedom and Democracy (VVD) and the Labour Party (PvdA). A more traditional grand coalition cabinet was the Third Lubbers cabinet, comprising the Christian-democratic Christian Democratic Appeal (CDA) and the Labour Party (PvdA).

Spain
In Spain, the term "grand coalition" is typically used to refer to any hypothetical government formed between the centre-right to right-wing People's Party (PP) and the centre-left Spanish Socialist Workers' Party (PSOE). No such a coalition government as ever been formed at the national level, though it was proposed by then-Prime Minister Mariano Rajoy during the 2015–2016 government formation process. Rajoy's own investiture on 29 October 2016 was allowed through the abstention of PSOE's MPs in what was dubbed as a "covert grand coalition", in reference to PSOE's tolerance of Rajoy's minority government through punctual agreements until the re-election of Pedro Sánchez as party leader in June 2017.

At the regional level, grand coalitions between the two largest parliamentary forces have been rare, but examples exist:
Basque Country: PNV–PSE, 1986–1990 and 1991–1998.
Navarre: UPN–PSN, 2011–2012.

Additionally, both PSOE and PP formed a joint coalition government—which also included other parties—following a successful vote of no confidence on the Cantabrian regional government of Juan Hormaechea in 1990, enduring until the 1991 regional election. At the time, however, the PP was not among the two largest political parties in the regional assembly.

Switzerland 

Switzerland is a Directorial Republic, which means that the role of Head of State is collectively exercised by the Cabinet of Ministers, who are each elected by Parliament and whose chair is primus inter pares. (On the levels of government from the Cantons down to the local municipalities, the executive council is usually directly elected.) The Federal Council consists of 7 members who are elected by the Federal Assembly (both National Council and Council of States) in joint session, with the chair, the Federal President, and the vice-president elected annually in rotation by Parliament in order of seniority—meaning that Switzerland actually has no Prime Minister and no member of the Federal Council is superior to another.

By constitutional convention since 1959, the so-called "Magic Formula" allocates seats in the Federal Council to the four major parties represented in Parliament. Due to that, these major parties form a de facto perennial "grand coalition" or constant national unity government with a supermajority in both the National Council and the Council of States. This magic formula was adjusted after the Swiss People's Party (SVP) became the largest party represented in Parliament in the 2003 elections, transferring one seat in the Federal Council from the CVP to the SVP.

Turkey 

Turkey's first grand coalition was formed after the 1961 general election, with members of Republican People's Party and Justice Party. At the same time, the grand coalition was also Turkey's first coalition government.

United Kingdom

The UK has had grand coalitions in central government during periods of wartime.  They are referred to as the "National Government".

Northern Ireland

The Northern Ireland Executive, the devolved administration of Northern Ireland, combines the largest Nationalist (also predominantly left of centre) and Unionist (also predominantly right of centre) parties.  The chief post, of First Minister and deputy First Minister, is a diarchy. Most recently, this coalition was led by the Democratic Unionist Party and Sinn Féin.

All parties, major and minor, are offered posts in the executive, although they may opt to form an opposition.

Cayman Islands

The Cayman Islands, a British overseas territory, has an incumbent coalition between the largest parties; the centre-left Progressives and centre-right Democrats.

See also
Cooperative games
Grand Coalition for Fiji

Hung parliament
National unity government
Purple coalition

References

External links
Gerd Strohmeier "Grand Coalitions - Political Reasons and Political Impacts"

 
Political science terminology
Game theory